Vacanze di Natale 2000 (Christmas Vacation 2000) is a 1999 Italian comedy film directed by Carlo Vanzina.

Cast
Massimo Boldi as Ettore Colombo
Christian De Sica as Giovanni Covelli
Megan Gale as herself
Enzo Salvi as Oscar "Er Cipolla"
Carmen Electra as Esmeralda
Nino D'Angelo as Pasquale Esposito
Monica Scattini as Patrizia Covelli
Emanuela Grimalda as Countess Allegra dal Pozzo
Micaela Ramazzotti as Giada Covelli
Virginie Marsan as Azzurra Covelli
Francesca Romana Messere as Azzurra's friend 
Andrea Castoldi as Marco Colombo
Irene Ferri as Morena
Katy Monique Cuomo as Lucy
Andrea Lupo as Paolo Scottoni
Giammarco Rocco Di Torrepadula as Roberto
Luciana Ussi Alzati as Silvia Colombo
Nunzia Schiano as Giuseppina Esposito
Adriano Pantaleo as Gennaro "Gennarino" Esposito

References

External links

1999 films
Films directed by Carlo Vanzina
1990s Italian-language films
1999 comedy films
Italian comedy films
1990s Italian films